Adrián "Adri" Hernández Montoro (born 4 January 1995) is a Spanish footballer who plays as a right back for CF Montañesa.

Club career
Born in Terrassa, Barcelona, Catalonia, Adri finished his development at RCD Espanyol. He made his senior debut with Tercera División club UD Barbastro in 2013, before signing with Girona FC the following year.

On 18 July 2015, after only featuring with the reserves, Adri joined UD Somozas in Segunda División B. On 11 July of the following year, he moved to fellow league side AE Prat.

On 13 July 2017, Adri agreed to a contract with UE Cornellà still in the third division. On 31 August, however, he moved to another reserve team, Sporting de Gijón B in the same level. His maiden appearance for the first team of the latter took place 28 January 2018, when he started in a 2–0 home win against Gimnàstic de Tarragona in the Segunda División championship.

On 29 June 2018, Adri signed with UD Almería from division two. He made his competitive debut for the Andalusians on 11 September, playing the full 90 minutes in a 2–1 away defeat of Málaga CF for the season's Copa del Rey and scoring the winning goal.

On 25 August 2019, after being demoted to third-choice after the arrival of Iván Balliu, Montoro terminated his contract with Almería. He was without club until 14 November 2019, where he re-joined UE Cornellà.

References

External links

1995 births
Living people
Footballers from Terrassa
Spanish footballers
Association football defenders
Segunda División players
Segunda División B players
Tercera División players
Divisiones Regionales de Fútbol players
UD Barbastro players
Girona FC B players
UD Somozas players
AE Prat players
UE Cornellà players
Sporting de Gijón B players
Sporting de Gijón players
UD Almería players
CF Montañesa players